Allobates is a genus of frogs in the family Aromobatidae. They are native to the Central and South Americas, from Nicaragua to Bolivia and Brazil, with one species on Martinique.

Description and ecology
Species of the genus Allobates are mostly small frogs. Dorsal colouration is cryptic, with the exception of the Allobates femoralis group that has bright colours. They are mostly terrestrial frogs found in the leaf litter of tropical rain forests. Most species deposit eggs in the leaf litter; tadpoles are transported to the water on the backs of the parents. Allobates nidicola and Allobates chalcopis, however, have endotrophic tadpoles that develop into froglets in the nest, without entering water.

Taxonomy
There are 58 species recognised in the genus Allobates:

References

External links 

"The Chirping Frog" - 2018 BBC internet article on new species found in the Pico da Neblina National Park, Brazil

 
Aromobatidae
Amphibians of Central America
Amphibians of South America
Amphibian genera